Křečovice is a municipality and village in Benešov District in the Central Bohemian Region of the Czech Republic. It has about 800 inhabitants.

Administrative parts

Villages and hamlets of Brdečný, Hodětice, Hořetice, Hůrka, Krchleby, Lhotka, Nahoruby, Poličany, Skrýšov, Strážovice, Vlkonice, Zhorný and Živohošť are administrative parts of Křečovice.

In popular culture
A comedy film My Sweet Little Village was filmed there in 1985.

Notable people
Josef Suk (1874–1935), composer; his home is now the Josef Suk Memorial

References

External links

Villages in Benešov District